Cryptosara auralis is a moth in the family Crambidae. It was described by Snellen in 1872. It is found in the Democratic Republic of Congo.

References

Moths described in 1872
Pyraustinae
Endemic fauna of the Democratic Republic of the Congo